Sodalis glossinidius is a species of bacteria, the type and only species of its genus. It is a microaerophilic secondary endosymbiont of the tsetse fly. Strain M1T is the type strain. Sodalis glossinidius is the only gammaproteobacterial insect symbiont to be cultured and thus amenable to genetic modification, suggesting that it could be used as part of a control strategy by vectoring antitrypanosome genes. The organism may increase the susceptibility of tsetse flies to trypanosomes.

Despite gene erosion and pseudogene multiplication in a genome of Sodalis glossinidius, these pseudogenes remain actively transcribed.

Parasites 
S. glossinidius is itself host to a prophage discovered by Clark et al. 2007.

References

Further reading

External links 
LPSN

Type strain of Sodalis glossinidius at BacDive -  the Bacterial Diversity Metadatabase

Bacteria described in 1999